Thapar may refer to
Thapar (surname)
Thapar family
Thapar University in Punjab, India
Thapar Polytechnic College in Punjab, India
Thapar Vidya Vihar, a school in Telangana, India
Thapar Group, a company in India

See also
 Thapa (disambiguation)